The Industrial Bank Cup is a tournament for professional female tennis players played on outdoor hardcourts. The event is classified as a $60,000 ITF Women's Circuit tournament and has been held annually in Quanzhou, China since 2009.

Past finals

Singles

Doubles

External links
 ITF search 

ITF Women's World Tennis Tour
Hard court tennis tournaments
Tennis tournaments in China
Sport in Quanzhou
Recurring sporting events established in 2009